The following is a list of all IFT-licensed over-the-air television stations broadcasting in the Mexican state of Coahuila. There are 40 television stations in Coahuila.

List of television stations

|-

|-

|-

|-

|-

|-

|-

|-

|-

|-

|-

|-

|-

|-

|-

|-

|-

|-

|-

|-

|-

|-

|-

|-

|-

|-

|-

|-

|-

|-

|-

|-

|-

|-

|-

|-

|-

|-

|-

|-

Defunct stations
 XHIA-TV 2, Torreón (1967–2006)

See also
List of television stations in Texas for stations across the US border serving cities in Coahuila
Television stations in Durango for stations in Gómez Palacio

Notes

References

Coah